Streatham is a district in south London, England.

Streatham was in Surrey before becoming part of the County of London in 1889, and then Greater London in 1965. The area is identified in the London Plan as one of 35 major centres in Greater London.

History

Streatham means "the hamlet on the street". The street in question, the London to Brighton Way, was the Roman road from the capital Londinium to the south coast near Portslade, today within Brighton and Hove. It is likely that the destination was a Roman port now lost to coastal erosion, which has been tentatively identified with 'Novus Portus' mentioned in Ptolemy's Geographia.  The road is confusingly referred to as Stane Street (Stone Street) in some sources and diverges from the main London-Chichester road at Kennington.

After the departure of the Romans, the main road through Streatham remained an important trackway. From the 17th century it was adopted as the main coach road to Croydon and East Grinstead, and then on to Newhaven and Lewes. In 1780 it then became the route of the turnpike road from London to Brighton, and subsequently became the basis for the modern A23. This road (and its traffic) have shaped Streatham's development.

Streatham's first parish church, St Leonard's, was founded in Saxon times but an early Tudor tower is the only remaining structure pre-dating 1831 when the body of the church was rebuilt. The medieval parish covered a wider area including Balham and Tooting Bec. The southern portion of what is now Streatham formed part of Tooting Graveney ancient parish.

A charter states that in the late seventh century, land in Streatham and Tooting Graveney was granted by Erkenwald and Frithwald to Chertsey Abbey, a grant which was later confirmed in the time of Athelstan in 933.

Streatham appears in Domesday Book of 1086 as Estreham. It was held by Bec-Hellouin Abbey (in Normandy) from Richard de Tonbrige. Annually it was assessed to render £4 5s 0d to its overlords.

Streatham Village and Streatham Wells

The village remained largely unchanged until the 18th century, when its natural springs, known as Streatham Wells, were first celebrated for their health-giving properties. The reputation of the spa, and improved turnpike roads, attracted wealthy City of London merchants and others to build their country residences in Streatham.

In spite of London's expansion, a limited number of developments took place in the village in the second half of the nineteenth century, Streatham Vale sprung up to the South later still and the small parade of shops by Streatham Common Station has become known colloquially as Streatham Village.

Wellfield Road, which had previously been known as Leigham Lane, was renamed to reflect its role as the main route from the centre of Streatham to one of the well locations.  Another mineral well was located on the south side of Streatham Common, in an area that now forms part of The Rookery, where it can still be seen and visited within the formal gardens.

Streatham Park or Streatham Place

In the 1730s, Streatham Park, a Georgian country mansion, was built by the brewer Ralph Thrale on land he bought from the Lord of the Manor - the fourth Duke of Bedford. Streatham Park later passed to Ralph's son Henry Thrale, who with his wife Hester Thrale entertained many of the leading literary and artistic characters of the day, most notably the lexicographer Samuel Johnson. The dining room contained 12 portraits of Henry's guests painted by his friend Joshua Reynolds. These pictures were wittily labelled by Fanny Burney as the Streatham Worthies.

Streatham Park was later leased to Prime Minister Lord Shelburne, and was the venue for early negotiations with France that led to the Peace Treaty of 1783. Streatham Park was demolished in 1863.

Park Hill
One large house that survives is Park Hill, on the north side of Streatham Common, rebuilt in the early 19th century for the Leaf family. It was latterly the home of Sir Henry Tate, sugar refiner, benefactor of local libraries across south London, including Streatham Library, and founder of the Tate Gallery at Millbank.

Urbanisation
Development accelerated after the opening of Streatham Hill railway station on the West End of London and Crystal Palace Railway in 1856. The other two railway stations followed within fifteen years.
Some estates, such as Telford Park to the west of Streatham Hill, were spaciously planned with facilities like tennis clubs. Despite the local connections to the Dukes of Bedford, there is no link to the contemporary Bedford Park in west London. Another generously sized development was Roupell Park, the area near Christchurch Road promoted by the Roupell family. Other streets adopted more conventional suburban layouts.
Three more parish churches were built to serve the growing area, including Immanuel and St Andrew's (1854), St Peter's (1870) and St Margaret the Queen's (1889).
There is now a mixture of buildings from all architectural eras of the past 200 years.

The inter-war period
After the First World War Streatham developed as a location for entertainment, with the Streatham Hill Theatre, three cinemas, the Locarno ballroom and Streatham Ice Rink all adding to its reputation as "the West End of South London". With the advent of electric tram services, it also grew as a shopping centre serving a wide area to the south. In the 1930s large numbers of blocks of flats were constructed along the High Road. These speculative developments were not initially successful. They were only filled when émigré communities began to arrive in London after leaving countries under the domination of Hitler's Germany. In 1932 the parish church of the Holy Redeemer was built in Streatham Vale to commemorate the work of William Wilberforce.

Retail decline and recovery

In the 1950s Streatham had the longest and busiest shopping street in south London. Streatham became the site of the UK's first supermarket, when Express Dairies Premier Supermarkets opened its first  store in 1951; Waitrose subsequently opened its first supermarket in Streatham in 1955, but it closed down in 1963.

However, a combination of factors led to a gradual decline through the 1970s and a more rapid decline in the 1980s. These included long term population movements out to Croydon, Kingston and Sutton; the growth of heavy traffic on the A23 (main road from central London to Gatwick Airport and Brighton); and a lack of redevelopment sites in the town centre. This culminated in 1990 when the closure of Pratts, which had grown from a Victorian draper's shop to a department store operated since the 1940s by the John Lewis Partnership, coincided with the opening of a large Sainsbury's supermarket half a mile south of the town centre, replacing an existing, smaller Sainbury's store opposite Streatham Hill railway station.

Several recent additions, such as Argos, Lidl and Peacocks, are located in new retail spaces on the site of Pratt's but, in common with other high streets, retail recovery has been slow, and a substantial proportion of vacant space has been taken by a growing number of restaurants, bars and coffee shops.

In August 2011, Streatham was selected as one of the areas to benefit from Round 1 of the Mayor of London's Outer London Fund, gaining £300,000. Later, Streatham was awarded a further £1.6 million, matched by another £1 million by Lambeth. The money from this fund was spent on improving streets and public spaces in Streatham. This includes the smartening up of shop fronts through painting and cleaning, replacing shutters and signage as well as helping to reveal facilities behind the high street such as The Stables Community Centre. Streatham Library has also undergone a £1.2 million refurbishment. The Tudor Hall behind the library was brought back into public use as The Mark Bennett Centre providing a meeting and performance space. Streatham Skyline introduced new lighting to highlight some of Streatham's more attractive buildings and monuments with the aim of improving safety and the overall attractiveness of the area.

Contemporary Streatham 

In September 2002, Streatham High Road was voted the "Worst Street in Britain" in a poll organised by the BBC Today programme and CABE. This largely reflected the dominance of through traffic along High Road.

Plans for investment and regeneration had begun before the poll, with local amenity group the Streatham Society leading a successful partnership bid for funding from central government for environmental improvements. Work started in winter 2003–04 with the refurbishment of Streatham Green and repaving and relighting of the High Road between St Leonard's Church and the Odeon Cinema. In 2005 Streatham Green won the Metropolitan Public Gardens Association 'London Spade' award for best public open space scheme in the capital.

The poll was a catalyst for Lambeth London Borough Council and Transport for London's Street Management to co-operate on a joint funding arrangement for further streetscape improvements, which benefited the section of the High Road between St Leonard's and Streatham station, and the stretch north of the Odeon as far as Woodbourne Avenue. The section between Woodbourne Avenue and Streatham Hill station was not completed until 2015. Any further improvements north of Streatham Hill have been halted because of TfL's budgetary shortfall.

Streatham Festival was established in 2002. It has grown to a festival with over 50 events held in an array of locations, from bars to churches and parks to youth centres, attracting over 3,000 people.

After several years of delay and controversy over phasing, construction started in the autumn of 2011 on the Streatham Hub - a major redevelopment next to Streatham railway station. The project was a joint development by Lambeth Council and Tesco.  The project involved the demolition of Streatham Ice Arena, Streatham Leisure Centre and the former Streatham Bus Garage, and their replacement with a new leisure centre and a Tesco store with 250 flats above it. Streatham Leisure Centre closed in November 2009 due to health and safety concerns when part of the pool hall ceiling collapsed. Streatham Ice Arena closed on 18 December 2011, having celebrated eighty years of operation in February 2011.  For two years a temporary ice rink was provided at Popes Road, Brixton.

In November 2013, the new Streatham Ice and Leisure Centre opened to the public. The leisure centre houses a 60 m x 30 m indoor ice rink with 1,000 rink-side seats on the upper floors, a six-lane 25 m swimming pool, 13 m teaching pool, four-court sports hall and a gym with 100 stations.

The jazz venue Hideaway continues Streatham's long entertainment tradition. It features live performances of jazz, funk, swing and soul music as well as stand-up comedy nights. It won the Jazz Venue/Promoter of the Year category in the 2011 Parliamentary Jazz Awards.

On 2 February 2020 at around 14:00 GMT, Sudesh Mamoor Faraz Amman attacked and injured two people using a machete on Streatham High Street in what police  declared a terrorist incident. Alongside the machete, Amman was also wearing a vest with components made to look like improvised explosive devices. He was pursued by armed police and was fatally shot outside a Boots pharmacy.

Streatham High Road also was host to Cat's Whiskers which later became Caesar's nightclub in the early 1990s through to 2005, which closed to become the site of the newly developed block of flats with a Marks and Spencer supermarket and Starbucks.

Administration 
Streatham is covered by Lambeth London Borough Council and lies within the parliamentary constituency of the same name.

Demography
In the 2011 census, Streatham, comprising the wards of Streatham Hill, Streatham South and Streatham Wells, was White or White British (55.3%), Black or Black British (24.1%), Asian or Asian British (10%), Mixed/multiple ethnic groups (7.5%), and  Other ethnic group (2.2%). The largest single ethnicity is White British (35.5%).

Education
Bishop Thomas Grant School
Dunraven School
Woodmansterne School
Streatham & Clapham High School
London Steiner School
 Sunnyhill Primary School
 Hitherfield Primary School
 Streatham Wells Primary School
 St Andrews RC Primary School
 Goldfinch Primary School (Formerly Eardley Primary School)
 Penwortham Primary School (Wandsworth)
 St Leonard's Primary School
 Broomwood Hall Lower School
 Henry Cavendish Primary School (Streatham campus)

Sport
Streatham RedHawks (ice hockey)
London Warriors (American football)
South London Storm (rugby league)
Streatham-Croydon RFC

Places of worship
 St Leonard's Church (Church of England) - the historic parish church
 English Martyrs' Church (Roman Catholic) - located opposite St Leonard's - it is the second of Streatham's "twin spires"
 Christ Church, Streatham Hill (Church of England)
 Holy Redeemer Church, Streatham Vale (Church of England)
 Immanuel and St Andrew Church, Streatham (Church of England)
 St Margaret the Queen, Cricklade Avenue, Streatham Hill (Church of England)
 St Peter's Church, Streatham (Church of England)
 St Simon and St Jude, Hillside Road, Streatham Hill (Roman Catholic)
 Streatham Baptist Church, Lewin Road
 Hambro Road Baptist Church
 Streatham Methodist Church, Riggindale Road
 New Covenant Church, Pendennis Road
 Islamic Centre, Estreham Road (Shi’a)
 Streatham Friends Meeting House, Roupell Park Estate (Religious Society of Friends (Quakers))
 Streatham Mosque, Mitcham Lane (Sunni)
 Streatham Hill Mosque, Norfolk House Road (Sunni)
 South London Synagogue, Leigham Court Road (United Synagogue)
 South London Liberal Synagogue, Prentis Road (Liberal Judaism)
 Hitherfield Road Baptist Church Streatham {SW16 2LN}
 St James' Streatham, Mitcham Lane (SW16 6NT)
 Mitcham Lane Baptist Church, Mitcham Lane (SW16 6NT)
 St Albans - Evangelical, Pretoria Road (SW16 6RR)
 Streatham Central Church, Wellfield Road (SW16 2BP)

Notable residents

Among the people who were born, lived or worked in Streatham, or are otherwise associated with the area are:

Arthur Anderson, P&O founder, and Liberal Radical MP
Lynda Baron, actor
Jonathan Bartley, former co-leader of the Green Party 
Giuseppe Baretti, linguist
Arnold Bax, composer
Sarah Beeny, television presenter
Floella Benjamin, actress and TV presenter 
Hywel Bennett, actor
Ian Bostridge, Tenor
Mark Bostridge, Writer
Bernard Braden, Actor and TV personality
Druce Brandt, cricketer
Henry Robertson Bowers, explorer 
Edmund Burke, philosopher
Charles Burney, composer and music historian
Frances Burney, novelist and playwright
Simon Callow, actor
Naomi Campbell, model
Geoffrey Cather, Victoria Cross-winning soldier
Christopher Chessun, bishop of Southwalk- official residence in Streatham
Nicholas Clay, actor
Lionel Crabb, George Medal recipient
Aleister Crowley
Dave, rapper
Carl Davis, composer
Peter Davison, actor
Kevin Day, comedian
Henry Doulton, Founder Royal Doulton
Siobhan Dowd, author
William Dring, Portrait Artist, RA
William Dyce, artist, professor
Hester Maria Elphinstone, Viscountess Keith, literary correspondent
Paul England, actor, director, and author, born in Streatham
Edward Foster, Victoria Cross
John Galliano, fashion designer
George Galloway, former MP
David Garrick, actor
Edward Stanley Gibbons, philatelist
Oliver Goldsmith, novelist, playwright and poet
Grooverider, DJ
Isidore Gunsberg, Chess master
David Gurr, author
Derek Guyler, actor
Jeremy Hardy, comedian
David Harewood, actor
Sir Norman Hartnell, royal dressmaker
Patricia Hayes, actor
Hy Hazell, actress
Sir Arthur Helps, Writer
Benjamin Hoadley, Bishop
Glyn Hodges, professional footballer and manager
Roy Hudd, comedian and TV personality
Rachel Hurd-Wood, actor
Eddie Izzard, comedian and actor
David Jacobs,  TV and radio presenter
Alan Johnson, MP
Frederick Henry Johnson, Victoria Cross
Dr Samuel Johnson, author and lexicographer
Sadiq Khan, Mayor of London
Zardad Khan, Afghan warlord
Mark King, musician
Winifred Knights, artist 
Arthur Moore Lascelles, Victoria Cross
Benny Lee, entertainer
Ken Livingstone, former MP and former Mayor of London
Laurence Llewelyn-Bowen, interior designer  
John Major, Prime Minister 1990–97, lived at Primrose Court 1969-74
Horace Brooks Marshall, Lord Mayor of London
Ken Mackintosh, dance band leader
Donald McGill, seaside postcard artist
Cathy McGowan, television presenter
Paul Merton, comedian
Roger Moore, actor
Naga Munchetty, TV Presenter
VS Naipaul, nobel prizewinner literature
Rudy Narayan, barrister and civil rights activist
Belgrave Ninnis, Explorer, Doctor
Belgrave Edward Sutton Ninnis, Explorer, Royal Fusiliers
David Nixon, TV magician
Steven Norris, former MP and London Mayoral Candidate
Daphne Park, Baroness and British Spy
Cynthia Payne, celebrity madame
Horatio Frederick Phillips, aviation pioneer
Alistair Pirrie, TV presenter
Patricia Plunkett, actor
Steve Reed, MP
Sir Joshua Reynolds, artist
Geoffrey Rimbault, first-class cricketer and British Army officer
Catherine Russell, actor
Arthur Sanders, WW2 RAF Commander, Air Chief Marshal
Duncan Sandys, Lord, MP 
Leslie Scarman, Baron Scarman, Law Lord
Lord Shelburne, prime minister
Alan Simpson, Comedy script writer
Arnold Spencer-Smith, explorer
Michaela Strachan, TV presenter and actress
Graham Sutherland, artist
Henry Tate, sugar merchant and philanthropist 
Shaw Taylor, actor and TV presenter
Hester Thrale, author and patron of the arts
Henry Thrale, MP and brewer
Nina Toussaint-White, actress
John Torode, chef and TV presenter
Stan Tracey, jazz musician
Tommy Trinder, comedian
Leonora Tyson, suffragist
Chuka Umunna, former Labour and Liberal Democrat MP
Dennis Wheatley, author
June Whitfield, actress
W. P. D. Wightman FRSE (1899-1983), scientific author
John Lewis Wolfe (1798-1881), architect, artist and stockbroker
Bill Wyman, musician
Andy Zaltzman, comedian

Nearest places 
 Balham
 Brixton
 Colliers Wood
 Clapham Park
 Crystal Palace
 Furzedown
 Herne Hill
 Mitcham
 Norbury
 Pollards Hill
 Thornton Heath
 Tooting
 Upper Norwood
 West Norwood
 Wimbledon

Transport

Railway stations 

Tube stations 

References

Further reading

External links 

 
Districts of the London Borough of Lambeth
Areas of London
Major centres of London
History of the London Borough of Lambeth